First window may refer to:

first broadcast syndication rights for a work
the post-grant review period for third-party challenge and opposition of a pending patent or trademark
a wavelength band or transmission window in fibre-optic communications
the initial 4-6 hour period of ischemic preconditioning, known as classical or early preconditioning, in which a coronary occlusion can limit injuries of a subsequent ischaemia reperfusion in the myocardium

See also
Second window (disambiguation)
Window (disambiguation)
Windowing (disambiguation)
Windows (disambiguation)